Josh Mierkalns (born 11 September 1985) is an English former cricketer. He is a right-handed batsman and a right-arm medium-pace bowler who currently plays for Nottinghamshire. Mierkalns' second XI career began in 2003, when he made his debut against Yorkshire's Second XI.

Mierkalns represented the Nottinghamshire first-team in August 2006 when he played in a match against the touring West Indians. The following month he played in a Pro40 match against Durham, though he was soon dropped from the team. His county career ended after he was diagnosed with ulcerative colitis.

Mierkalns remains an occasional member of the Nottinghamshire Second XI. He was a member of the Nottinghamshire Second team which reached the final of the 2005 Second XI trophy.

References

External links
Josh Mierkalns at Cricket Archive

1985 births
English cricketers
Living people
Nottinghamshire cricketers